Local Newspaper of the Year is a Norwegian award that is conferred every year by the country's National Association of Local Newspapers. It was awarded for the first time in 1989. The newspaper Hallingdølen has won the prize four times: in 2005, 2008, 2012, and 2014.

List of winners

References

External links
 National Association of Local Newspapers

Norwegian awards
Awards established in 1989